Club Atlético Tembetary Ypané is a football club from Villa Elisa, Paraguay, founded in 1912 in Asunción. The club currently plays in the Paraguay third-tier. Despite being a very small team that is actually part of the lower divisions of Paraguayan football, it is very well known for producing good players in its youth divisions. The club was previously named Bermejo Football Club until 1920, when the club's name was changed to Club Atlético Tembetary. Tembetary is the former home of Paraguayan World Cup players Nelson Cuevas and Nelson Haedo Valdez, Argentine Fabián Caballero and Moroccan Mourad Hdiouad.

Notable players
To appear in this section a player must have either:
 Played at least 125 games for the club.
 Set a club record or won an individual award while at the club.
 Been part of a national team at any time.
 Played in the first division of any other football association (outside of Paraguay).
 Played in a continental and/or intercontinental competition.

1990's
  Fabian Caballero (1997, 1999)
  Nelson Cuevas (1997–1998)
  Nelson Haedo Valdez (1998–2001)
2000's
  Celso Guerrero (2000)
  Osvaldo Mendoza (2004)
  Nery Cardozo (2005-2007)
  Luciano Vazquez {2006)
Non-CONMEBOL players
  Mourad Hdiouad (1998)

Honours
Paraguayan Second Division: 5
1959, 1976, 1983, 1988, 1995

Paraguayan Third Division: 2
1955, 1992

External links
 Paraguayan Soccer Information and Directoy
 Tembetary directoy at Albigol

References

 
Football clubs in Paraguay
Association football clubs established in 1912
1912 establishments in Paraguay